Fort Howard was a 19th-century fortification in the north central United States, built by the U.S. Army. It was located along the west bank of the Fox River in Green Bay, Wisconsin.

History
Along with Fort Crawford at Prairie du Chien, Fort Howard was constructed during the War of 1812 to protect the Fox-Wisconsin Waterway, an important regional trade and travel route between Lake Michigan and the Mississippi River, from British invasion. The fort was built at the site of the earlier French Fort La Baye (and renamed Fort Edward Augustus by the British in 1761). The initial estimate of its building cost was $16,644.70. (Military History of the Upper Great Lakes) For a time it was commanded by Zachary Taylor.

During an outbreak of malaria in 1820, the garrison moved to Camp Smith on higher ground nearby. Fort Howard was reoccupied two years later. Abandoned again in 1841, when the garrison was sent to Florida during the Seminole Wars, the fort was officially decommissioned in 1853.

In 1863, the United States government granted land to the States of Michigan and Wisconsin for construction of a military road between Fort Howard and Fort Wilikins near Copper Harbor, Michigan. This road was completed in 1872.

Following the fort's closure its buildings fell into decay. Several structures were subsequently removed to the Camp Smith site, where they are now part of the Heritage Hill State Historical Park. Three of the fort's remaining structures are listed on the National Register of Historic Places: the hospital, hospital ward, and officers' quarters.

Later use of name
In the 20th century, the Fort Howard Paper Company was a pulp and paper manufacturer based in Green Bay, founded by Austin E. Cofrin in 1919. It merged with James River in 1997 to form Fort James Corporation and became part of Georgia-Pacific in 2000.

Images

Notes

External links
 Heritage Hill State Historical Park
 History buffs launch search for Fort Howard's footprint

Buildings and structures in Brown County, Wisconsin
Howard
1816 establishments in Illinois Territory
Pre-statehood history of Wisconsin
Zachary Taylor
Fox–Wisconsin Waterway
1853 disestablishments in Wisconsin